Crataegus altaica is a species of hawthorn. It is sometimes considered
to be a synonym of C. wattiana. Crataegus altaica var. villosa is considered to be a synonym of Crataegus maximowiczii.

See also
 List of hawthorn species with yellow fruit

References

altaica